Åre Municipality is a municipality in Jämtland County in northern Sweden. Its seat is located in Järpen.

The present municipality was formed in 1974 through the amalgamation of "old" Åre Municipality with the surrounding municipalities Hallen, Kall, Mörsil and Undersåker. The largest village, Järpen, situated in Undersåker, was chosen as the seat of the new entity.

Localities
There are six localities (or urban areas) in Åre Municipality:

The municipal seat in bold

Notable people
 Henrik Lundqvist – Former goalkeeper for the New York Rangers of the National Hockey League, and the Frölunda Indians of the Swedish Hockey League, gold medalist in the Winter Olympics in 2006. Born in Åre, though he moved to Båstad to support his sister's tennis career. He is twins with Joel Lundqvist.
 Joel Lundqvist – center for the Frölunda Indians (SHL), former center for the Dallas Stars (NHL), 2 time world champion. Born in Åre, though he moved to Båstad to support his sister's tennis career. He is twins with Henrik Lundqvist.

Gallery

See also
Åre Ski Area
Edsåsdalen
Skalstugan

References

External links

Åre Municipality - Official site
VisitAre.com - Tourism site
Åre Bike Park - Official site
Åre Bike Festival - Official site
www.are-sweden.com - Information on Are Ski resort

Municipalities of Jämtland County
Diocese of Härnösand